The 2013 Caesar & Imperial Cup is a professional tennis tournament played on outdoor hard courts. It is the second edition of the tournament which is part of the 2013 ITF Women's Circuit, offering a total of $50,000 in prize money. It takes place in Taipei, Taiwan, on 28 October–3 November 2013.

WTA entrants

Seeds 

 1 Rankings as of 21 October 2013

Other entrants 
The following players received wildcards into the singles main draw:
  Chan Hao-ching
  Hsu Ching-wen
  Juan Ting-fei
  Lee Hua-chen

The following players received entry from the qualifying draw:
  Katherine Ip
  Kotomi Takahata
  Wu Ho-ching
  Aki Yamasoto

Champions

Singles 

  Paula Kania def.  Zarina Diyas 6–1, 6–3

Doubles 

  Lesley Kerkhove /  Arantxa Rus def.  Chen Yi /  Luksika Kumkhum 6–4, 2–6, [14–12]

External links 
 2013 Caesar & Imperial Cup at ITFtennis.com

2013 ITF Women's Circuit